Giuseppe Luigi Trevisanato (15 February 1801 – 28 April 1877) was an Italian Roman Catholic cardinal who served as the Patriarch of Venice from 1862 until his death.

Life Events 

1801 births
1877 deaths
19th-century Italian cardinals
Cardinals created by Pope Pius IX
Patriarchs of Venice
Roman Catholic archbishops in Italy
Bishops in Friuli-Venezia Giulia
19th-century Italian Roman Catholic archbishops